David Ferrer was the defending champion, but lost in the quarterfinals to Iván Navarro.

Seeds

Draw

Finals

Top half

Bottom half

External links
Main Singles draw
Qualifying draw

Ordina Open - Men's Singles
Ordina Open - Men's Singles
Rosmalen Grass Court Championships